Anna Alexandrovna Nechaevskaya (born 21 August 1991) is a Russian cross-country skier. She competed in the women's 10 kilometre freestyle at the 2018 Winter Olympics.

Cross-country skiing results
All results are sourced from the International Ski Federation (FIS).

Olympic Games
 1 medal – (1 bronze)

World Championships
 1 medal – (1 bronze)

World Cup

Season standings

References

External links
 

1991 births
Living people
People from Vologda Oblast
Russian female cross-country skiers
Olympic cross-country skiers of Russia
Olympic bronze medalists for Olympic Athletes from Russia
Olympic medalists in cross-country skiing
Cross-country skiers at the 2018 Winter Olympics
Place of birth missing (living people)
Medalists at the 2018 Winter Olympics
Tour de Ski skiers
FIS Nordic World Ski Championships medalists in cross-country skiing
Universiade gold medalists for Russia
Universiade silver medalists for Russia
Universiade medalists in cross-country skiing
Competitors at the 2017 Winter Universiade
Sportspeople from Vologda Oblast